The cobla (plural cobles) is a traditional music ensemble of Catalonia, and in Northern Catalonia in France. It is generally used to accompany the Sardana, a traditional Catalan folk dance, danced in a circle.

Structure
The modern Cobla normally consists of 11 players with the following instruments:

One flabiol, a type of fipple flute played with the left hand while a tamborí, a small drum attached to the left arm of the player, is played with the other hand. 
Four Catalan shawms – double-reed woodwinds
Two tibles – a tible is like an oboe, but with a louder sound
Two tenores – a tenora is a larger version of the tible
Five brass instruments
Two trumpets
A trombone – often a valve-trombone
Two fiscorns – a fiscorn is a rotary-valved baritone saxhorn with the bell facing forward, similar in appearance to a large flugelhorn
A string bass – originally and still often a three-string double bass

There are small variations to this instrumentation in contemporary coblas: for example there is sometimes a third trumpet player.

The playing formation has two rows. The front row has (as seen by the audience from left to right) the flabiolist (with pipe and drum), the second and first tibles, and the first and second tenores. The back row, often raised, has the second and first trumpets, the trombone, and the first and second fiscorns. The double bass player, often standing, is on the right of the band.

History

Originally, the cobla was a 3-piece band:
One person played the flabiol and drum
The second person played the tible
The third played bagpipes

The main instrument in the cobla, the tenora, was developed around 1850 by French-Catalan luthier Andreu Toron, in Perpignan/Perpinyà.

The modern 11-piece cobla was developed by the Catalan musician Josep Maria "Pep" Ventura.  He wrote over 200 Sardana compositions.  There is a small street named after him in Barcelona, as well as a subway stop, presumably because of this achievement.

See also
Sardana

External links
La Sardana Videos of cobles performing sardanes
 El testament n'Amèlia Video of a performance of this sardana (composer Joan Lamote de Grignon), by the cobla "Comtat d'Empúries" in Castelló d'Empúries
The Selvatana Cobla site has many pictures and the history of this particular cobla, which was founded in 1913.
www.cobla-amsterdam.nl, site of the only non-Catalan cobla in the world, Cobla La Principal d'Amsterdam, founded in 1987 by a group of Dutch professional musicians, distinguished with the Catalan Creu de Sant Jordi in 2007.
The Sardana and I, an essay about Catalan traditional dancing and music.
45-sec Video of Sardana music and dance on Commons 
Audio Recording of Cobla Music, Palamos, Catalunya
 MP-3 examples of sardana music are available on the Selvatana Cobla and Cobla Sabadell sites.

Catalan music
Sardana

de:Sardana#Die Cobla, das Sardana-Orchester